Shawn Jones (born March 25, 1992) is an American-born Kosovan professional basketball player for Hapoel Haifa of the Israeli Basketball Premier League. He played college basketball for Middle Tennessee State University, where he was named the Conference USA Men's Basketball Player of the Year in 2014.

High school career
Jones attended Hialeah High School in Hialeah, Florida. As a senior in 2009–10, he averaged 23.3 points, 14.3 rebounds and 9.1 blocks per game as he earned first team All-Dade County and third team All-State honors.

College career
In his four-year career at Middle Tennessee State, Jones played 131 games (62 starts), averaging 8.5 points, 4.9 rebounds and 1.2 blocks per game. In his senior season in 2013–14, he was named the Conference USA Men's Basketball Player of the Year. He was also named to the Conference USA first team and NABC Division I All-District 11 first team, while also being named a participant of the Reese's College All-Star Game.

Professional career
After going undrafted in the 2014 NBA draft, Jones joined the Los Angeles Clippers for the 2014 NBA Summer League. On September 23, 2014, he signed with the Miami Heat. However, he was later waived by the Heat on October 25, 2014 after appearing in four preseason games. On November 3, 2014, he was acquired by the Sioux Falls Skyforce of the NBA Development League as an affiliate player. In 49 games for the Skyforce in 2014–15, he averaged 13.1 points, 8.8 rebounds, and 1.2 blocks per game.

In July 2015, Jones joined the Washington Wizards for the 2015 NBA Summer League. On August, 14, he signed a one-year deal with MoraBanc Andorra of the Liga ACB. On October 25, 2015, Jones recorded a career-high 23 points, shooting 10-of-11 from the field, along with six rebounds in a 74–77 loss to Manresa.

On July 11, 2016, Jones signed a three-year deal with Hapoel Jerusalem. Jones helped Jerusalem to win the 2016 Israeli League Cup, as well as reaching the 2017 EuroCup Semifinals, where they eventually were eliminated by Valencia. On April 20, 2017, he was loaned to Sidigas Avellino for the rest of the season.

On June 22, 2017, Jones signed with Dinamo Sassari for the 2017–18 season. In 30 games played for Sassari, Jones averaged 10.0 points and 6.6 rebounds per game.

On August 21, 2018, Jones returned to Israel for a second stint, signing a one-year deal with Hapoel Holon. On March 9, 2019, Jones recorded 21 points, shooting 7-of-10 from the field, along with six rebounds and three blocks in a 96–95 overtime win over Ironi Nes Ziona. He was subsequently named Israeli League Round 21 MVP. Jones helped Holon reach the 2019 FIBA Europe Cup Semifinals, where they eventually were eliminated by his former team Dinamo Sassari.

On July 20, 2019, Jones signed with Boulazac Basket Dordogne for the 2019–20 season. On October 9, 2019, his contract was terminated due to an incident in the preseason game against Nanterre. On November 8, 2019, Jones signed a one-year deal with Anwil Włocławek of the Polish Basketball League. On December 8, 2020, he signed again with Anwil and joined the team for a second season.

On August 1, 2022, he signed with Spójnia Stargard of the Polish Basketball League (PLK). In eight games he averaged 14.2 points and 8.6 rebounds per game.

On November 24, 2022, he signed with Hapoel Haifa of the Israeli Basketball Premier League.

The Basketball Tournament
In 2017, Jones participated in The Basketball Tournament for Blue Zoo, a team of Middle Tennessee alumni. The team was eliminated in the first round. The Basketball Tournament is an annual $2 million winner-take-all tournament broadcast on ESPN.

Kosovo national team
On July 11, 2016, Jones received a Kosovan passport, and became a member of the Kosovo national basketball team.

On February 23, 2018, Jones made his first appearance for the Kosovan team in the 2019 FIBA Basketball World Cup qualification game against Poland.

Personal life
Jones is the son of Andrew and Cynthia Jones.

Career statistics

College

|-
| style="text-align:left;"| 2010–11
| style="text-align:left;"| Middle Tennessee
| 32 || 2 || 10.9 || .505 || .000 || .684 || 2.3 || .3 || .3 || .6 || 4.1
|-
| style="text-align:left;"| 2011–11
| style="text-align:left;"| Middle Tennessee
| 32 || 1 || 16.2 || .551 || .000 || .585 || 3.3 || .2 || .4 || 1.2 || 7.3
|-
| style="text-align:left;"| 2012–13
| style="text-align:left;"| Middle Tennessee
| 34 || 26 || 21.1 || .498 || .000 || .635 || 5.4 || .4 || .3 || 1.3 || 8.5
|-
| style="text-align:left;"| 2013–14
| style="text-align:left;"| Middle Tennessee
| 33 || 33 || 28.2 || .577 || .000 || .687 || 8.5 || .6 || .9 || 1.9 || 14.2
|-

References

External links
RealGM profile
FIBA profile
MTSU bio

1992 births
Living people
ABA League players
American expatriate basketball people in Andorra
American expatriate basketball people in Croatia
American expatriate basketball people in Israel
American expatriate basketball people in Italy
American expatriate basketball people in Poland
American expatriate basketball people in Spain
American men's basketball players
Basketball players from Florida
BC Andorra players
Expatriate basketball people in Andorra
Boulazac Basket Dordogne players
Centers (basketball)
Dinamo Sassari players
Hapoel Holon players
Hapoel Jerusalem B.C. players
KK Włocławek players
KK Split players
Kosovan men's basketball players
Kosovan expatriate basketball people in Spain
Kosovan expatriate basketball people in Israel
Kosovan expatriate basketball people in Italy
Kosovan people of African-American descent
Liga ACB players
Middle Tennessee Blue Raiders men's basketball players
Naturalised citizens of Kosovo
People from Hialeah, Florida
People with acquired Kosovan citizenship
Power forwards (basketball)
S.S. Felice Scandone players
Sioux Falls Skyforce players
Spójnia Stargard players
Sportspeople from Miami-Dade County, Florida